Yuri Valentinovich Nesterenko (born 5 December 1946 in Kharkov, USSR, now Ukraine) is a Soviet and Russian mathematician who has written papers in algebraic independence theory and transcendental number theory.

In 1997, he was awarded the Ostrowski Prize for his proof that the numbers π and eπ are algebraically independent. In fact, he proved the stronger result:
 the numbers π, eπ, and Γ(1/4) are algebraically independent over Q.
 the numbers π, and Γ(1/3) are algebraically independent over Q.
 for all positive integers n, the numbers π,   are algebraically independent over Q.

He is a professor at Moscow State University, where he completed the mechanical-mathematical program in 1969, then the doctorate program (Soviet habilitation) in 1973, became a professor of the Number Theory Department in 1992.

He studied under Andrei Borisovich Shidlovskii. Nesterenko's students have included Wadim Zudilin.

Publications

References

External links

A picture
Web page at Moscow State University ; switch to Windows-1251 encoding if your browser does not render correctly.

Russian mathematicians
Corresponding Members of the Russian Academy of Sciences
Living people
Year of birth missing (living people)